Lucian Bălan (25 June 1959 – 12 November 2015) was a Romanian football player and coach, winner of the European Cup and the European Supercup in 1986 and the European Supercup, both with Steaua București and former coach at a football school in Baia Mare.

Career
Lucian Bălan played one friendly game at international level for Romania, making his appearance on 8 April 1987 when coach Emerich Jenei sent him on the field at half-time to replace Gavril Balint in a 3–2 home victory against Israel.

On 25 March 2008, he was decorated by the president of Romania, Traian Băsescu for the winning of the UEFA Champions League with Ordinul "Meritul Sportiv" — (The Order "The Sportive Merit") class II.

Bălan died by suicide on 12 November 2015.

Honours
FC Baia Mare
Divizia B: 1981–82
Steaua București
Divizia A: 1985–86, 1986–87, 1987–88, 1988–89
Romanian Cup: 1986–87, 1988–89
European Cup: 1985–86
UEFA Super Cup: 1986

Notes

References

External links

1959 births
Footballers from Bucharest
Romanian footballers
Romania international footballers
Romanian expatriate footballers
Association football midfielders
AFC Rocar București players
CS Minaur Baia Mare (football) players
FC Steaua București players
K. Beerschot V.A.C. players
Liga I players
Liga II players
Belgian Pro League players
Real Murcia players
Expatriate footballers in Belgium
Expatriate footballers in Spain
Romanian football managers
CS Minaur Baia Mare (football) managers
Romanian expatriate sportspeople in Spain
Romanian expatriate sportspeople in Belgium
Suicides in Romania
2015 suicides
2015 deaths